James Jeremy McInerny (12 April 1933 – 27 May 2012) was an English first-class cricketer.

McInerny was born at Paddington in April 1933. He was educated at Christ's Hospital, before going up to Hertford College, Oxford. While studying at Oxford, McInerny played first-class cricket for Oxford University in 1955 and 1956, making two appearances against the Free Foresters and the Marylebone Cricket Club. He scored 25 runs in these matches with a high score of 22. McInerny died in May 2012.

References

External links

1933 births
2012 deaths
People from Paddington
People educated at Christ's Hospital
Alumni of Hertford College, Oxford
English cricketers
Oxford University cricketers